Mustapha Ibrahim might refer to:

Mustapha Ibrahim (Nigerian footballer), Nigerian footballer
Mustapha Ibrahim (Egyptian footballer), Egyptian footballer